Abu Shagara is a residential area in the emirate of Sharjah, UAE. It is one of the thickly populated areas of the Emirates. One of the biggest parks is the Abu Shagara Park.

External links 
 New offer to Abu Shagara traders Sharjah -  Auto Park can house 700 car showrooms
 Gulf News Report - Down the years in Abu Shagara
 The National News paper - Old vehicles put dealers on the road to success
 Khaleej Times - Sharjah to shift Abu Shagara used car market
  Sharjah Municipality warns used cars dealers not to take up public spaces after complaints from local residents.

Sharjah (city)